Birmingham was an Amtrak train station in Birmingham, Michigan, served by the Wolverine service. The station was located on an embankment at the eastern end of Villa Road, and consisted of a concrete platform with a small shelter and wheelchair lift.

Historically, Birmingham had been a station for frequent Grand Trunk Western passenger service from Detroit to Pontiac and Durand. Until 1960 the GTW operated trains that went beyond Durand to Grand Rapids, on to Muskegon, where ferries could be boarded, for travelling across Lake Michigan, to Milwaukee. At Durand Union Station passengers could transfer the La Salle and the Inter-City Limited to Chicago, to the Inter-City Limited to Toronto and to mixed trains bound for Saginaw and Bay City.

References

External links

Birmingham Amtrak Station (USA Rail Guide -- Train Web)

Former Amtrak stations in Michigan
Buildings and structures in Oakland County, Michigan
Transportation in Oakland County, Michigan
Railway stations closed in 2014